Islamnagar can refer to:

 Islamnagar, Badaun, nagar panchayat in Badaun district in the Indian state of Uttar Pradesh.
 Islamnagar, Karachi, neighbourhood in Baldia Town in Karachi, Sindh, Pakistan.
 Islamnagar, Lahore, neighbourhood in Gulberg Town in Lahore, Punjab, Pakistan. 
 Islamnagar, Bhopal, village and former fortified city near Bhopal, India